The Lurgi–Ruhrgas process is an above-ground coal liquefaction and shale oil extraction technology. It is classified as a hot recycled solids technology.

History
The Lurgi–Ruhrgas process was originally invented in the 1940s and further developed in the 1950s for a low-temperature liquefaction of lignite (brown coal).  The technology is named after its developers Lurgi Gesellschaft für Wärmetechnik G.m.b.H. and Ruhrgas AG. Over a time, the process was used for coal processing in Japan, Germany, the United Kingdom, Argentina, and former Yugoslavia.  The plant in Japan processed also cracking petroleum oils to olefins.

In 1947–1949, the Lurgi–Ruhrgas process was used in Germany for shale oil production. In Lukavac, Bosnia and Herzegovina, two retorts for liquefaction of lignite were in operation from 1963 to 1968. The capacity of the plant was 850 tons of lignite per day.  The plant in Lincolnshire, the United Kingdom, operated in 1978–1979 with capacity of 900 tons of coal per day. In late 1960s and early 1970s oil shales from different European countries and from the Green River Formation of Colorado, the United States, were tested at the Lurgi's pilot plant in Frankfurt.  In the United States, the technology was promoted in cooperation with Dravo Corporation. In the 1970s, the technology was licensed to the Rio Blanco Shale Oil Project for construction of a modular retort in combination with the modified in situ process.  However, this plan was terminated.

In 1980, the Natural Resources Authority of Jordan commissioned from the Klöckner-Lurgi consortium a pre-feasibility study of construction of an oil shale retorting complex in Jordan using the Lurgi–Ruhrgas process. However, although the study found the technology feasible, it was never implemented.

Technology
The Lurgi–Ruhrgas process is a hot recycled solids technology, which processes fine particles of coal or oil shale sized . As a heat carrier, it uses spent char or spent oil shale (oil shale ash), mixed with sand or other more durable materials.  In this process, crushed coal or oil shale is fed into the top of the retort.  In retort, coal or oil shale is mixed with the  heated char or spent oil shale particles in the mechanical mixer (screw conveyor).  The heat is transferred from the heated char or spent oil shale to the coal or raw oil shale causing pyrolysis. As a result, oil shale decomposes to shale oil vapors, oil shale gas and spent oil shale.  The oil vapor and product gases pass through a hot cyclone for cleaning before sending to a condenser. In the condenser, shale oil is separated from product gases.

The spent oil shale, still including residual carbon (char), is burnt at a lift pipe combustor to heat the process.  If necessary, additional fuel oil is used for combustion.  During the combustion process, heated solid particles in the pipe are moved to the surge bin by pre-heated air that is introduced from the bottom of the pipe. At the surge bin, solids and gases are separated, and solid particles are transferred to the mixer unit to conduct the pyrolysis of the raw oil shale.

One of the disadvantages of this technology is the fact that produced shale oil vapors are mixed with shale ash causing impurities in shale oil. Ensuring the quality of produced shale oil is complicated as compared with other mineral dusts the shale ash is more difficult to collect.

See also
 Galoter process
 Alberta Taciuk process
 Petrosix process
 Kiviter process
 TOSCO II process
 Fushun process
 Paraho process
 KENTORT II
 Union process

References

Oil shale technology
Coal
Thermal treatment